The Open Dialogue Foundation (ODF), formerly known as the Open Dialog Foundation, (Polish: Fundacja Otwarty Dialog), is an international non-governmental organization, founded in 2009 in Poland and currently headquartered in Brussels, Belgium, that conducts research and advocacy on human rights and the rule of law in the post-Soviet area and – since 2018 – within the European Union.

History

ODF was founded in 2009 in Warsaw, Poland and officially registered in 2010 by Lyudmyla Kozlovska, Ukrainian national from Sevastopol, Crimea. Kozlovska moved to Poland after the Orange Revolution in order to study. She had been a civic activist since the age of 13, when she opened the first Ukrainian library in Sevastopol. As a teenager she organized protests under the headquarters of the Russian Federation's Black Sea Fleet.

Kozlovska launched ODF following a human rights forum on Central Asia she had organized in Poland in 2008 with activists from Kazakhstan, Uzbekistan, and Kyrgyzstan and after having met Andrzej Grzyb MEP, who invited her to the European Parliament to speak on human rights in Kazakhstan and Uzbekistan. Initially, ODF based its activities on experiences of student movements and civic organisations that developed from the Orange Revolution.

Activities

Kazakhstan

During and following the 2011 Zhanaozen massacre in Kazakhstan ODF monitored the situation and campaigned for the release of the jailed oil workers and for the investigation of the allegations of torture. On the second anniversary of the events ODF opened an exhibition on the massacre at Warsaw University, inaugurated by Adam Michnik, and a dedicated website at www.zhanaozen.eu.

In April 2013 ODF co-organised and co-financed an 8-day human rights monitoring mission of the Polish Supreme Bar Council to Kazakhstan.

Since then ODF organises monitoring missions and advocates for human rights in Kazakhstan (e.g. in the framework of consultations for the UN High Commissioner for Human Rights or for the OSCE).

On 11 February 2021, the European Parliament adopted a resolution on the human rights situation in Kazakhstan, which included parts prepared by ODF.

Ukraine

ODF became known in Poland following its support for the Euromaidan revolution in Ukraine. The foundation organised 3 monitoring missions between November 2013 and January 2014 with Polish MPs Michał Jaros, Tomasz Makowski, Michał Szczerba and Marcin Święcicki and 3 concerts at the Euromaidan. In January 2014 it started a long-term monitoring mission and opened a permanent tent at the Euromaidan with the goal to "monitor the situation, support visits of international observers and share knowledge on the European Union". The mission lasted 56 days and included around 30 volunteers on the ground, with a total of 480 volunteers involved with the foundation between January and April 2014. The ODF tent was the only permanent presence of an NGO from the European Union at the Euromaidan.

ODF organised a mass humanitarian support campaign for the Euromaidan, sending a total of 35 tons of medicine, medical supplies, bulletproof vests and helmets to the protesters, journalists and observers, 10 tons of which went to the Donbas region. The total value of humanitarian aid delivered by ODF to Ukraine in 2014 was over PLN 1.000.000. Following its involvement in Ukraine the foundation became a target for Russian propaganda.

From late February 2014 until early June 2016 ODF run a support centre in central Warsaw for Ukrainian refugees under the name "Ukrainian World". The centre was estimated to have supported over 30.000 people during its functioning. At later stages the centre changed its focus to promoting Ukrainian culture in Poland.

Since 2014 ODF has been campaigning for Russia's release of Ukrainian pilot Nadiya Savchenko and the imposing of sanctions on Russia following her detention, as well as that of Oleg Sentsov and numerous other Ukrainian war and political prisoners illegally held in Russia.

In October 2016 ODF co-organised a "march of solidarity with Ukraine" in Warsaw.

The foundation has also been advocating for democratic reforms and greater integration of Ukraine and the EU.

Russia 
The foundation's activities related to Russia started in 2014 and were at first focused on campaigning for the release of political prisoners and prisoners of war following Russia's invasion of Ukraine, most notably pilot Nadiya Savchenko and film director Oleg Sentsov. For this purpose ODF joined other EU and Ukrainian human rights NGOs to organise an international advocacy campaign under the name "#LetMyPeopleGo", with a platform for monitoring and listing the so-called "hostages of the Kremlin" launched with the Center for Civil Liberties / Euromaidan SOS at www.letmypeoplego.org.ua.

In 2018, Swedish publishing house Ariel Förlag published the story of the Russian persecution of Ukrainian director Oleg Sentsov and other Kremlin prisoners based on ODF's report.

As of 2019 ODF has also been campaigning against the renewal of voting rights of the Russian Federation in the Parliamentary Assembly of the Council of Europe, for the enforcement of European sanctions against Russia and for introducing a worldwide "Magnitsky Act".

Moldova 
ODF has been advocating for human rights and the rule of law in Moldova by organising human rights monitoring missions. It cooperates with international bodies like the OSCE, where it advocated in cases of politically persecuted judges and the nullified 2018 Chișinău mayoral election or the Parliamentary Assembly of the Council of Europe, where ODF organised a seminar in June 2017, together with deputies from three PACE fractions, focused on corruption and the persecution of dissidents in Ukraine and Moldova. ODF's report on cases of persecuted judges and prosecutors in Poland and in Moldova was included, together with a similar report by the Helsinki Foundation for Human Rights, in the United Nations General Assembly's 41st Human Rights Council's "Report on the independence of judges and lawyers", published on 29 April 2019.

Poland 
In Poland ODF initially supported the civic opposition movements defending the independent judiciary, especially in mid-2017 during the attempted reform of the Supreme Court and other controversial reforms of the judiciary by the ruling majority. These reforms prompted the European Commission to invoke Article 7 of the European Treaty against Poland, denouncing the reforms as putting the judiciary under the political control of the ruling majority and citing "serious risk [to] the independence of the judiciary and the separation of powers". In response to the crisis, on 21 July 2017 ODF Board's Chair Bartosz Kramek published an article on civic disobedience, which was viewed by pro-government media as a call for a revolution and prompted then-foreign minister Witold Waszczykowski to officially request that the article be removed and to instruct fiscal authorities to conduct a "complex fiscal control" of the foundation. In October 2017 the foreign ministry filed a request to the court to forcefully dissolve and replace the foundation's board, but the request was dismissed by the court on 7 December.

ODF's advocacy in Poland focuses on the rule of law and especially the freedom of the judiciary and civic freedoms. ODF's report on cases of persecuted judges and prosecutors in Poland (incl. notable cases such as Igor Tuleya, Waldemar Żurek & Jerzy Stępień) was included, together with a similar report by the Helsinki Foundation for Human Rights, in the United Nations General Assembly's 41st Human Rights Council's "Report on the independence of judges and lawyers", published on 29 April 2019.

During President Andrzej Duda's visit to Washington, DC in June 2019, an ODF delegation led by board member Martin Mycielski held meetings at the Capitol, with the State Department and with other US stakeholders to "update them on the state of civic freedoms in Poland, especially the persecution of civic activists" and share most recent reports on Poland. This mission was criticised by Polish pro-government pundits incl. Aleksandra Jakubowska, Dawid Wildstein and Rafał Ziemkiewicz, as well as the Head of the Political Cabinet of the Minister of National Defence Łukasz Kudlicki.

During a protest on 20 January 2021, the chairman of the board of the Open Dialogue Foundation, Bartosz Kramek, was pepper sprayed by police officers and thrown to the ground in the snow, then detained. Police alleged that Kramek threw snowballs at them, which he denied, with his claims being confirmed by video recordings of the event.

On 26 January 2021 the Parliamentary Assembly of the Council of Europe adopted a resolution entitled "Judges in Poland and in the Republic of Moldova must remain independent", with amendments prepared by ODF.

Interpol 
At least since 2013 ODF has been campaigning for the reform of Interpol, focused on the abuse of its “Red Notice” system by authoritarian states – notably Russia, Turkey, Belarus, Azerbaijan and Kazakhstan – for the persecution of political exiles. To that end ODF has held events in the European Parliament and national parliaments of EU member states, at the PACE, OSCE PA and ODIHR HDIM sessions, as well as provided expertise for Interpol bodies.

Controversies

Poland

ODF has been a subject of controversy since mid-2017, when its Board's Chair Bartosz Kramek had published a Facebook article on possible civil disobedience actions against the Law and Justice government in Poland. In August 2018 the Polish government expelled ODF President and Bartosz Kramek's wife Lyudmyla Kozlovska from the Schengen zone by entering her into the Schengen Information System, citing secret intelligence that the NGO had received Russian funding. In an interview, Polish foreign minister Witold Waszczykowski admitted that the reasons for the expulsion were ODF "pursuing anti-Polish goals in Brussels", and taking "actions against a democratically elected government" by "writing a detailed plan on how to topple the Polish government".

The Polish government's action was met with criticism from EU officials and the international public opinion. Former Belgian prime minister and president of the ALDE Group in the European Parliament Guy Verhofstadt MEP commented that "Black lists against democracy activists are worthy of authoritarian regimes, not of EU Member States. The Schengen visa ban on Lyudmila Kozlowska must be withdrawn – or Poland’s role in Schengen reviewed", with the ALDE Group directing two open letters to the European Commission on the matter. The Helsinki Foundation for Human Rights, in its statement, noted that the actions of Polish authorities were incompatible with EU law.

Protests were organised in Poland in support of Kozlovska and a public petition was initiated on 21 August by former Polish president and Nobel Peace Prize laureate Lech Wałęsa, asking EU heads of state to enable Kozlovska's return to the EU. The petition was signed by over 30,000 citizens and over 80 high-profile figures, including EU Commissioner Elżbieta Bieńkowska, Pulitzer Prize recipient Anne Applebaum, Lord Ashdown of Norton-sub-Hamdon, former government ministers Leszek Balcerowicz, Radosław Sikorski, Sławomir Nowak & Marcin Święcicki, the S&D Group in the European Parliament, Oscar-nominated director Agnieszka Holland, Gazeta Wyborcza editor-in-chief Adam Michnik, Newsweek Polska editor-in-chief Tomasz Lis, numerous Members of the European Parliament and Members of Parliament from Poland and Ukraine, NGOs, academics, journalists and other figures.

In an open letter initiated by the Ukrainian Helsinki Group, 11 Ukrainian civil and human rights organisations protested the inclusion of Kozlovska in SIS, calling it a "dangerous precedent which triggers a new kind of harassment of public activists in EU countries because of their public disagreement with state policy". The organisations claimed they supported ODF as "The organisation is actively working to release Ukrainian citizens imprisoned for political reasons in Russia and occupied Crimea, and is consistently pushing for sanctions against Vladimir Putin and his entourage for gross human rights abuses".

In mid-September 2018 the Schengen ban was disregarded by German authorities, who permitted Kozlovska to speak at the Bundestag, causing outrage in Poland, with the Polish foreign ministry summoning the German ambassador to protest and Polish president Andrzej Duda raising the matter with his German counterpart, Frank-Walter Steinmeier. She was next invited by Guy Verhofstadt to speak in the European Parliament on 26 September, with Belgian authorities disregarding the Polish ban, again causing backlash in Poland. In the end also France, Switzerland and the UK have disregarded the ban, letting Kozlovska speak on her case and the rule of law situation in Poland at the Council of Europe, the United Nations in Geneva and the House of Commons, respectively.

On 4 March Kozlovska received a 5-year residence permit in Belgium, which, according to EU law (Article 25 of the Schengen acquis) forces Poland to withdraw the SIS ban. In its ruling of 16 April the Voivodeship Administrative Court in Warsaw revoked the decision to include Kozlovska in SIS, claiming the secret documents on which it was based were "too general" and "failed to show how [she] poses a risk to nationality security". On 24 June the media announced that Poland had deleted Kozlovska from SIS, but that she likely still remains on the national list of unwanted persons.

From 24 to 26 June, Dziennik and Dziennik Gazeta Prawna published a series of articles under the label "DGP investigations", uncovering new details about the case and claiming Polish secret services had collaborated with those of Moldova. This information has supposedly surfaced following the change of power in Moldova and its aftermath, resulting in the fall of the Vladimir Plahotniuc-led regime and the election of Maia Sandu to the post of Prime Minister. The investigation furthermore included a controversial revelation that the Fiscal and Customs Office in Łódź, tasked with investigating ODF by then-foreign minister Witold Waszczykowski, was until 28 February 2017 run by his brother, Tomasz, who still remains a senior official there.

In February 2021, state broadcaster TVP removed or amended nearly 40 articles and video materials about ODF following a court decision from September 2019. During a court hearing the same month, former Catholic priest Jacek Międlar, accused of inciting hate, called for the banning of the Open Dialogue Foundation, among others.

On 23 June 2021, Kramek was arrested and charged with money laundering. The public prosecutor's office claimed that Kramek received PLN 5.3 million (around USD ) from fictitious companies registered in global tax havens, and passed the funds on to Russian and Ukrainian nationals using bank accounts belonging to ODP and his own company Silk Road. ODP denied any wrongdoing and claimed that the charges are politically motivated.

Moldova
ODF's activities became a subject of controversy in November 2018 following a report published by a closed-door Moldovan parliamentary committee, claiming the organisation was linked to the Russian Federation and had attempted to interfere with domestic Moldovan politics by funding of opposition parties. Some Moldovan press articles on the other hand viewed the report as an attack on the pro-EU Party of Action and Solidarity and Dignity and Truth Platform Party before the upcoming parliamentary elections.

The Moldovan parliamentary report on ODF again became a news story in Polish pro-government media in April 2019 following publications in the Scottish edition of The Sunday Times, which referenced the report, claiming ODF had received up to £1.6 million in donations from companies registered in Glasgow and Edinburgh. Prominent Polish governing coalition politicians like Ryszard Czarnecki and Patryk Jaki used these publications during their EP electoral campaign to attack the opposition, especially MEP Róża Thun, who had advocated for Lyudmyla Kozlovska following her expulsion. On 24 April, Onet.pl reported that the authors of the publications were in fact not Sunday Times journalists but the head of a PR agency and a pro-Brexit campaigner. The Economist's Balkan correspondent Tim Judah commented in an interview: "It's a very strange article. The authors cite the Moldovan parliament. I don't know anyone who would believe the findings of the Moldovan parliament."

Following the change of power in Moldova and election of Maia Sandu – who had earlier cooperated with ODF – to the post of Prime Minister, an investigation by Dziennik and Dziennik Gazeta Prawna revealed that the report, according to metadata, was "redacted or even entirely written by Andrian Candu", vice-chairman of the Democratic Party led by Vladimir Plahotniuc, who was not himself a member of the parliamentary committee. The publication also claimed that "Poland could have cooperated regarding ODF with security services controlled by Vladimir Plahotniuc", citing members of the committee. The Polish Chancellery of the Prime Minister responded to those allegations claiming that "the details of actions taken by special services are not revealed to the public due to legal reasons". The topic has reportedly been discussed by Polish foreign minister Jacek Czaputowicz and his Moldovan counterpart Tudor Ulianovschi at the OSCE Ministerial Council in Milan in December 2018.

Advocacy cases 
ODF has received criticism from far-right French MEP Nicolas Bay for one of the individual cases of human rights abuses that it had advocated for (together with Amnesty International and Human Rights Watch) – the case of Mukhtar Ablyazov, founder of the opposition political party Democratic Choice of Kazakhstan and opponent of Kazakhstan's first President Nursultan Nazarbayev. Bay alleged that ODF receives financial support from Ablyazov.

References

Political advocacy groups in Europe